The 2018–19 Országos Bajnokság I was the 36th season of the Országos Bajnokság I, Hungary's premier Water polo league.

Team information

The following 9 clubs compete in the OB I during the 2018–19 season:

Head coaches

Regular season

Schedule and results
In the table below the home teams are listed on the left and the away teams along the top.

Final round

Championship playoff
Teams in bold won the playoff series. Numbers to the left of each team indicate the team's original playoff seeding. Numbers to the right indicate the score of each playoff game.

Quarter-finals

Game 1

BVSC-Zugló Diapolo won the series 9–0 with points ratio, and advanced to the Semifinals.

 
FTC-Telekom Waterpolo won the series 9–0 with points ratio, and advanced to the Semifinals.

Semi-finals
Higher ranked team hosted Game 1 plus Game 3 if necessary. The lower ranked hosted Game 2.

Game 1

Game 2

UVSE-Hunguest Hotels won the series 2–0, and advanced to the Finals.

Game 3

Dunaújvárosi Egyetem-Maarsk Graphics won the series 2–1, and advanced to the Finals.

Finals
Higher ranked team hosted Game 1 and Game 3 plus Game 5 if necessary. The lower ranked hosted Game 2 plus Game 4 if necessary.

UVSE-Hunguest Hotels won the Final series 3–0.

Third place
Higher ranked team hosted Game 1 plus Game 3 if necessary. The lower ranked hosted Game 2.

BVSC-Zugló Diapolo won the Third place.

5th – 8th Placement matches

Relegation playout
Higher ranked team hosted Game 1 plus Game 3 if necessary. The lower ranked hosted Game 2.

5th – 8th Placement matches
Higher ranked team hosted Game 1 plus Game 3 if necessary. The lower ranked hosted Game 2.

Fifth place game

Seventh place game

Season statistics

Top goalscorers

Points classification

Number of teams by counties

See also
2018 Magyar Kupa (National Cup of Hungary)
2018 Szuperkupa (Super Cup of Hungary)

References

External links
 Hungarian Water Polo Federaration 
 vizipolo.hu

Seasons in Hungarian water polo competitions
Hungary
Orszagos Bajnoksag I Women
Orszagos Bajnoksag I Women